Pany Yathotou (born Xiangkhouang Province, 18 February 1951) is a Laotian politician and member of the Lao People's Revolutionary Party.

She was the chairwoman and governor of the Bank of the Lao P.D.R., the country's central bank, from 1988 until 1997. Yathotou later became a member of the National Assembly in 1998. She served as the President of the National Assembly of Laos from 2010 to 2021. Yathotou is a member of Laos' Hmong ethnicity. She is the first woman to be elected as Vice President of Laos.

References

1951 births
Living people
20th-century Laotian women politicians
20th-century Laotian politicians
Governors of the Bank of the Lao P.D.R.
Hmong politicians
Alternate members of the 4th Central Committee of the Lao People's Revolutionary Party
Members of the 5th Central Committee of the Lao People's Revolutionary Party
Members of the 6th Central Committee of the Lao People's Revolutionary Party
Members of the 7th Central Committee of the Lao People's Revolutionary Party
Members of the 8th Central Committee of the Lao People's Revolutionary Party
Members of the 9th Central Committee of the Lao People's Revolutionary Party
Members of the 10th Central Committee of the Lao People's Revolutionary Party
Members of the 11th Central Committee of the Lao People's Revolutionary Party
Members of the 8th Politburo of the Lao People's Revolutionary Party
Members of the 9th Politburo of the Lao People's Revolutionary Party
Members of the 10th Politburo of the Lao People's Revolutionary Party
Members of the 11th Politburo of the Lao People's Revolutionary Party
Lao People's Revolutionary Party politicians
21st-century Laotian women politicians
21st-century Laotian politicians
Members of the National Assembly of Laos
People from Xiangkhouang province
Presidents of the National Assembly of Laos
Vice presidents of Laos
Women vice presidents